The 1939 New South Wales Rugby Football League premiership was the thirty-second season of Sydney’s top-level rugby league club competition, Australia’s first. Eight teams from across the city contested the premiership during the season, which lasted from April until September  and culminated in Balmain’s victory over South Sydney in the final.

Season summary
This was to be the St. George club’s final season at Earl Park, Arncliffe, the following season moving back to Hurstville Oval.

Teams
 Balmain, formed on January 23, 1908, at Balmain Town Hall
 Canterbury-Bankstown
 Eastern Suburbs, formed on January 24, 1908, at Paddington Town Hall
 Newtown, formed on January 14, 1908
 North Sydney, formed on February 7, 1908
 South Sydney, formed on January 17, 1908, at Redfern Town Hall
 St. George, formed on November 8, 1920, at Kogarah School of Arts
 Western Suburbs, formed on February 4, 1908

Ladder

Finals
In the two semi finals, minor premiers Balmain narrowly defeated Canterbury whilst fourth-placed South Sydney beat second-placed St. George.

Premiership final

The decider was played on the weekend when the world’s future altered dramatically with the invasion of Poland by Germany leading to England, Australia and the world going to war.

The match was played at the Sydney Cricket Ground and refereed by George Bishop in front of 26,972. The game was tight in the first half with the Tigers scoring one try to lead 7–2 at the break.

In the second-half Balmain ran away with it, scoring six further tries to South Sydney’s none for a crushing seventh premiership title and the Tigers’ first since 1924. Star Balmain players of the time included Sid Goodwin, Frank Hyde, Tom Bourke, Athol Smith, Billy Bischoff, George Watt and Jim Quealey.

Balmain 33 (Tries: Tom Bourke 2, Frank Hyde, J. Redman, Jim Quealey, D. Buckley, A. Smith. Goals: H. Day 5, W. Johnson )

defeated

South Sydney 4 (Fred Felsch 2 goals)

References

External links
 Rugby League Tables - Notes AFL Tables
 Rugby League Tables - Season 1939 AFL Tables
 Premiership History and Statistics RL1908
 
 Results: 1931-40 at rabbitohs.com.au

New South Wales Rugby League premiership
Nswrfl season